The 2018 Kennesaw State Owls football team represented Kennesaw State University in the 2018 NCAA Division I FCS football season. They were led by fourth-year head coach Brian Bohannon and played their home games at Fifth Third Bank Stadium in Kennesaw, Georgia as fourth-year members of the Big South Conference. They finished the season 11–2, 5–0 in Big South play to win the Big South conference championship for the second consecutive year. The Owls received the Big South's automatic bid to the FCS Playoffs. The Owls earned a No. 4 seed and a first round bye. They defeated Wofford in the second round before losing in the quarterfinals to No. 5 South Dakota State.

Previous season
The Owls finished the 2017 season 12–2, 5–0 in Big South play to win the Big South conference championship. The Owls received the Big South's automatic bid to the FCS Playoffs, their first trip to the playoffs in school history. In the first round of the playoffs, the Owls defeated Samford in a rematch of their only regular season loss and marked the school's first ever playoff win. In the second round, the Owls upset No. 3 seed Jacksonville State to advance to the quarterfinals. In the quarterfinals, despite a furious second half comeback, they lost to Sam Houston State.

On January 9, 2018, head coach Brian Bohannon was named the American Football Coaches Association's Coach of the Year.

Preseason

Big South poll
In the Big South preseason poll released on July 23, 2018, the Owls were predicted to finish as Big South champions.

Preseason All-Big South team
The Big South released their preseason all-Big South team on July 23, 2018, with the Owls having fourteen players selected along with two more at three positions on the honorable mention list. Quarterback Chandler Burks was named preseason offensive player of the year and linebacker Bryson Armstrong was named the preseason defensive player of the year.

Offense

Chandler Burks – QB

Darnell Holland – RB

Justin Sumpter – WR

C.J. Collins – OL

Joseph Alexander – OL

Ryan Warrior – OL

Defense

Desmond Johnson – DL

McKenzie Billingslea – DL

Bryson Armstrong – LB

Anthony Gore, Jr. – LB

Jace White – DB

Dorian Walker – DB

Special teams

Justin Thompson – K

Drew McCracken – LS

Honorable mention

Shaquil Terry – RB/KR

Nicholas Jones – P

Award watch lists

Schedule

Source:

Game summaries

at Georgia State

at Tennessee Tech

Alabama State

Clark Atlanta

Samford

Presbyterian

at Gardner–Webb

at Charleston Southern

Campbell

at Monmouth

vs. Jacksonville State

FCS Playoffs

Wofford–Second Round

South Dakota State–Quarterfinals

Ranking movements

References

Kennesaw State
Kennesaw State Owls football seasons
Big South Conference football champion seasons
Kennesaw State
Kennesaw State Owls football